Louis Ambler FSA FRIBA (2 June 1862 - 1 April 1946) was an English architect.

Career
He was born on 2 June 1862 in Manningham in Yorkshire, the son of John Ambler (1832-1889) and Mary Hannah Wood (1831-1893).

He was articled to Henry Francis Lockwood and William Mawson of Bradford where he won a prize in the Bradford Society of Architects and Surveyors Pupils’ Competition in 1883.  Later he was assistant to Robert William Edis. He also assisted George Frederick Bodley.

He began in independent practice in 1889 initially at 8 Osnaburgh Street, London, but by 1892 he had moved to The Clock House, Arundel Street, Strand, London. Later he was based at 200-2 Temple Chambers, Temple Avenue, London.

He was nominated for ARIBA in 1888 and FRIBA in 1900.

He was a Vice-President of the Society of Yorkshiremen in London in 1901.

In 1921 he was appointed a Fellow of the Royal Society of Antiquaries.

He died on 1 April 1946 at the Archway Hospital, Highgate in London and his funeral took place at the Undercliffe Cemetery, Bradford on 6 April 1946.

Publications
The old halls and manor houses of Yorkshire. Publisher: Batsford. 1913. 
The Ambler Family. Publisher: Percy Lund, Humphries and Company. 1924.

Notable works

References

1862 births
1946 deaths
Architects from Yorkshire
People from Manningham, Bradford
Associates of the Royal Institute of British Architects
Fellows of the Royal Institute of British Architects